The 1927 Mississippi State Teachers Yellow Jackets football team was an American football team that represented the Mississippi State Teachers College (now known as the University of Southern Mississippi) as an independent during the 1927 college football season. In their fourth year under head coach William Herschel Bobo, the team compiled a 3–4–1 record.

Schedule

References

Mississippi State Teachers
Southern Miss Golden Eagles football seasons
Mississippi State Teachers Yellow Jackets football